Armand Viellard-Migeon (1842–1905) was a French politician. He served in the Chamber of Deputies from 1885 to 1889.

Early life
Armand Viellard-Migeon was born in Méziré on 24 September 1842. His father, François Viellard-Migeon, was a politician.

Career
Viellard-Migeon served as a member of the Chamber of Deputies from 1885 to 1889.

Death
Viellard-Migeon died on 19 July 1905.

References

1842 births
1905 deaths
People from the Territoire de Belfort
Politicians from Bourgogne-Franche-Comté
Popular Liberal Action politicians
Members of the 4th Chamber of Deputies of the French Third Republic
Members of the 6th Chamber of Deputies of the French Third Republic
Members of the 7th Chamber of Deputies of the French Third Republic